The 2021 Purdue Fort Wayne Mastodons baseball team was a baseball team that represented Purdue University Fort Wayne in the 2021 NCAA Division I baseball season. The Mastodons were members of the Horizon League and play their home games at Mastodon Field in Fort Wayne, Indiana. They were led by second-year head coach Doug Schreiber.

Previous season
The Mastodons finished the 2020 NCAA Division I baseball season 5–10 overall (0–0 conference) and tied for first place in conference standings. The season was cut short in stages by March 12, 2020 due to the COVID-19 pandemic.

Preseason Horizon poll
For the 2021 poll, Purdue Fort Wayne was projected to finish in fifth in the Conference.

Roster

Schedule

! style="" | Regular Season
|- valign="top" 

|- bgcolor="#ccffcc"
| 1 || February 26 || at  || Reagan Field • Murray, Kentucky || 10–6 || Miller (1–0) || Gardner (0–1) || None || 100 || 1–0 || –
|- bgcolor="#ffcccc"
| 2 || February 26 || at Murray State || Reagan Field • Murray, Kentucky || 5–9 || Wenninger (1–0) || Boyd (0–1) || None || 50 || 1–1 || –
|- bgcolor="#ffcccc"
| 3 || February 27 || at Murray State || Reagan Field • Murray, Kentucky || 4–5 || Pennington (1–0) || Fee (0–1) || – || 107 || 1–2 || –
|- bgcolor="#ffcccc"
| 4 || February 27 || at Murray State || Reagan Field • Murray, Kentucky || 2–3 || Whaley (1–0) || Madura (0–1) || Holden (1) || 86 || 1–3 || –
|-

|- bgcolor="#ffcccc"
| 5 || March 5 || vs Youngstown State || Defiance High School • Defiance, Ohio || 3–6 || Clark (1–2) || Miller (1–1) || Clift Jr. (3) || 0 || 1–4 || 0–1
|- bgcolor="#ffcccc"
| 6 || March 6 || vs Youngstown State || Defiance High School • Defiance, Ohio || 0–3 || Floyd (1–1) || Boyd (0–2) || None || 0 || 1–5 || 0–2
|- bgcolor="#ccffcc"
| 7 || March 6 || vs Youngstown State || Defiance High School • Defiance, Ohio || 1–0 || Myers (1–0) || Cole (0–1) || None || 0 || 2–5 || 1–2
|- bgcolor="#ffcccc"
| 8 || March 7 || vsYoungstown State || Defiance High School • Defiance, Ohio || 8–13 || Perez (1–0) || Madura (0–2) || None || 0 || 2–6 || 1–3
|- bgcolor="#ccffcc"
| 9 || March 12 || at  || Bulldog Park • Indianapolis, Indiana || 6–3 || Miller (2–1) || Schultz (0–1) || Robison (2) || 150 || 3–6 || 1–3
|- bgcolor="#ffcccc"
| 10 || March 13 || at Butler || Bulldog Park • Indianapolis, Indiana || 0–2 || Myers (1–0) || Boyd (0–3) || Pilcher (1) || 150 || 3–7 || 1–3
|- bgcolor="#ccffcc"
| 11 || March 14 || at Butler || Bulldog Park • Indianapolis, Indiana || 9–6 || Myer (2–0) || Vore (1–0) || Robison (3) || 150 || 4–7 || 1–3
|- bgcolor="#ffcccc"
| 12 || March 19 ||  || Mastodon Field • Fort Wayne, Indiana || 3–9 || Deans (3–0) || Miller (2–2) || None || 89 || 4–8 || 1–4
|- bgcolor="#ccffcc"
| 13 || March 20 || Oakland || Mastodon Field • Fort Wayne, Indiana || 5–4 || Robison (1–0) || Hill (1–1) || None || 112 || 5–8 || 2–4
|- bgcolor="#ccffcc"
| 14 || March 20 || Oakland || Mastodon Field • Fort Wayne, Indiana || 6–3 || Myer (3–0) || Hill (1–2) || Robison (4) || 121 || 6–8 || 3–4
|- bgcolor="#ccffcc"
| 15 || March 21 || Oakland || Mastodon Field • Fort Wayne, Indiana || 8–7 || Miller (3–2) || Tucker (0–3) || None || 125 || 7–8 || 4–4
|- bgcolor="#ffcccc"
| 16 || March 26 || at  || Routine Field • Franklin, Wisconsin || 3–6 || Neu (2–0) || Robison (1–1) || Blubaugh (1) || 395 || 7–9 || 4–5
|- bgcolor="#ffcccc"
| 17 || March 27 || at Milwaukee || Routine Field • Franklin, Wisconsin || 6–5 || Wohlt (1–0) || Myer (3–1) || None || 451 || 7–10 || 4–6
|- bgcolor="#ffcccc"
| 18 || March 27 || at Milwaukee || Routine Field • Franklin, Wisconsin || 2–5 || LaRock (1–1) || Boyd (0–4) || McCarthy (2) || 451 || 7–11 || 4–7
|- bgcolor="#ffcccc"
| 19 || March 28 || at Milwaukee || Routine Field • Franklin, Wisconsin || 3–14 || Mahoney (2–3) || Pintarich (0–1) || None || 343 || 7–12 || 4–8
|-

|- bgcolor="#ccffcc"
| 20 || April 1 ||  || World Baseball Academy • Fort Wayne, Indiana || 14–0 || Pintarich (1–1) || Gerl (1–2) || None || 87 || 8–12 || 5–8
|- bgcolor="#ffcccc"
| 21 || April 2 || Northern Kentucky || Parkview Field • Fort Wayne, Indiana || 4–5 || Richardson (2–0) || Myer (3–2) || Noble (1) || 121 || 8–13 || 5–9
|- bgcolor="#ffcccc"
| 22 || April 2 || Northern Kentucky || Parkview Field • Fort Wayne, Indiana || 10–11 || Klingenbeck (3–2) || Miller (3–3) || Ollier (3) || – || 8–14 || 5–10
|- bgcolor="#ccffcc"
| 23 || April 3 || Northern Kentucky || Parkview Field • Fort Wayne, Indiana || 9–8 || Evenson (1–0) || Ollier (0–2) || None || – || 9–14 || 6–10
|- bgcolor="#bbbbbb"
| 24 || April 9 || at Wright State || Nischwitz Stadium • Dayton, Ohio || colspan=7| Canceled (COVID-19)
|- bgcolor="#bbbbbb"
| 25 || April 10 || at Wright State || Nischwitz Stadium • Dayton, Ohio || colspan=7| Canceled (COVID-19)
|- bgcolor="#bbbbbb"
| 26 || April 10 || at Wright State || Nischwitz Stadium • Dayton, Ohio || colspan=7| Canceled (COVID-19)
|- bgcolor="#bbbbbb"
| 27 || April 11 || at Wright State || Nischwitz Stadium • Dayton, Ohio || colspan=7| Canceled (COVID-19)
|- bgcolor="#ffcccc"
| 28 || April 16 || at  || Les Miller Field at Curtis Granderson Stadium • Chicago, Illinois || 0–1 || Key (4–2) || Pintarich (1–2) || None || 35 || 9–15 || 6–11
|- bgcolor="#ffcccc"
| 29 || April 17 || at UIC || Les Miller Field at Curtis Granderson Stadium • Chicago, Illinois || 0–2 || O'Reilly (2–5) || Myers (3–3) || Morris (1) || 76 || 9–16 || 6–12
|- bgcolor="#ffcccc"
| 30 || April 17 || at UIC || Les Miller Field at Curtis Granderson Stadium • Chicago, Illinois || 2–4 || Torres (3–1) || Miller (3–4) || Gosbeth (2) || 81 || 9–17 || 6–13
|- bgcolor="#ffcccc"
| 31 || April 18 || at UIC || Les Miller Field at Curtis Granderson Stadium • Chicago, Illinois || 4–11 || Nicholson (1–0) || Fee (0–2) || None || 70 || 9–18 || 6–14
|- bgcolor="#ffcccc"
| 32 || April 23 || at  || Bob Wren Stadium • Athens, Ohio || 2–12 || Rock (7–1) || Pintarich (1–3) || None || – || 9–19 || 6–14
|- bgcolor="#ffcccc"
| 33 || April 24 || at Ohio || Bob Wren Stadium • Athens, Ohio || 2–5 || Kutt IV (5–2) || Myer (3–4) || None || – || 9–20 || 6–14
|- bgcolor="#ffcccc"
| 34 || April 25 || at Ohio || Bob Wren Stadium • Athens, Ohio || 1–9 || Jones (2–2) || Miller (3–5) || None || – || 9–21 || 6–14
|- bgcolor="#ffcccc"
| 35 || April 30 || Wright State || Mastodon Field • Fort Wayne, Indiana || 1–9 || Schrand (4–4) || Pintarich (1–4) || None || 81 || 9–22 || 6–15
|-

|- bgcolor="#ffcccc"
| 36 || May 1 || Wright State || Mastodon Field • Fort Wayne, Indiana || 2–22 || Brehmer (6–2) || Myer (3–5) || None || 98 || 9–23 || 6–16
|- bgcolor="#ffcccc"
| 37 || May 1 || Wright State || World Baseball Academy • Fort Wayne, Indiana || 7–28 || Shirk (3–0) || Miller (3–6) || None || 111 || 9–24 || 6–17
|- bgcolor="#ffcccc"
| 38 || May 2 || Wright State || World Baseball Academy • Fort Wayne, Indiana || 6–29 || Cline (6–1) || Boyd (0–5) || None || 147 || 9–25 || 6–18
|- bgcolor="#ffcccc"
| 39 || May 7 || at Youngstown State || Eastwood Field • Niles, Ohio || 2–6 || Floyd (7–3) || Fee (0–3) || None || 219 || 9–26 || 6–19
|- bgcolor="#ffcccc"
| 40 || May 7 || at Youngstown State || Eastwood Field • Niles, Ohio || 4–15 || Clark (5–5) || Pintarich (1–5) || None || 219 || 9–27 || 6–20
|- bgcolor="#ccffcc"
| 41 || May 8 || at Youngstown State || Eastwood Field • Niles, Ohio || 3–1 || Miller (4–6) || Clift Jr. (2–3) || Boyd (1) || 218 || 10–27 || 7–20
|- bgcolor="#ffcccc"
| 42 || May 8 || at Youngstown State || Eastwood Field • Niles, Ohio || 5–7 || Coles (2–2) || Boyd (0–6) || None || 218 || 10–28 || 7–21
|- bgcolor="#ffcccc"
| 43 || May 14 || UIC || Mastodon Field • Fort Wayne, Indiana || 7–22 || Key (6–3) || Pintarich (1–6) || None || 101 || 10–29 || 7–22
|- bgcolor="#ffcccc"
| 44 || May 15 || UIC || Mastodon Field • Fort Wayne, Indiana || 2–20 || Torres (6–1) || Myer (3–6) || None || 168 || 10–30 || 7–23
|- bgcolor="#ffcccc"
| 45 || May 15 || UIC || Mastodon Field • Fort Wayne, Indiana || 6–18 || O'Reilly (4–5) || Miller (4–7) || None || 177 || 10–31 || 7–24
|- bgcolor="#ffcccc"
| 46 || May 16 || UIC || Mastodon Field • Fort Wayne, Indiana || 0–10 || Conrad (1–0) || Boyd (0–7) || None || 143 || 10–32 || 7–25
|- bgcolor="#ccffcc"
| 47 || May 21 || at Oakland || Oakland Baseball Field • Rochester, Michigan || 12–4 || 'Miller (5–7) || Konitzer (3–2) || None || 33 || 11–32 || 8–25
|- bgcolor="#ffcccc"
| 48 || May 21 || at Oakland || Oakland Baseball Field • Rochester, Michigan || 13–17 || Densmore (3–4) || Armstrong (0–1) || Paugh (1) || 33 || 11–33 || 8–26
|- bgcolor="#ffcccc"
| 49 || May 22 || at Oakland || Oakland Baseball Field • Rochester, Michigan || 5–6 || Nierman (4–6) || Myer (3–7) || None || 88 || 11–34 || 8–27
|- bgcolor="#ffcccc"
| 50 || May 22 || at Oakland || Oakland Baseball Field • Rochester, Michigan || 10–17 || Trovinger (1–0) || Fee (0–4) || None || 88 || 11–35 || 8–28
|-

References

Purdue Fort Wayne
Purdue Fort Wayne Mastodons baseball seasons
Purdue Fort Wayne